Jim Dewar may refer to:

 James Dewar (musician) (1942–2002), Scottish musician
 Jim Dewar (American football) (1922–1989), American football halfback

See also
 James Dewar (disambiguation)